Inseparable: How Family and Sacrifice Forged a Path to the NFL is an autobiography by American National Football League (NFL) players and twin brothers Shaquem Griffin and Shaquill Griffin. It was published by W Publishing Group, an imprint of Thomas Nelson, in 2019. The brothers wrote their autobiography with assistance from American sports journalist for ESPN and ghostwriter Mark Schlabach.

Plot summary
The book follows the lives of the Griffin brothers from birth through making it on the same NFL team, the Seattle Seahawks. The brothers start out training together and eventually pursue their football dreams separately, though yearning to compete alongside each other on the same team in the end. Through the course of their journey, two overarching themes emerge: 1) the importance of familial support in achieving one's goals, and 2) the role of faith in God for overcoming hardship and adversity.

Visuals
In addition to text, the autobiography contains eight pages of photographs printed in color ink.

Background and release
As part of promotion for the book's release, the Griffin brothers revealed on The Today Show they wrote the book in part to make themselves relatable to others. In the interview, Shaquill Griffin also provided a very direct answer as to why they made the book, "What motivated us was, first off, the way we were raised, in a household that was  family, faith, love, caring, and if you've got a story to tell, tell it". Mark Schlabach appeared on a radio show hosted by Mike Bianchi leading up to the release of the book where he shared why he took on the role of contributing author:

On Tuesday July 9, 2019 the book was officially released after being available for pre-order on Amazon prior to its release.

Promotion
All three authors contributed to the promotion of the book. Shaquem and Shaquill Griffin appeared on The Today Show in addition to promoting the book in-person at the 2019 ESPY Awards, where they literally carried the book in-hand as part of their promotion at the awards show. Around the time of the release of the book, the Griffin brothers also appeared on the Good Day L.A. program. They also promoted the book on their social media accounts, including Twitter, and the book was covered in an article published by the Orlando Sentinel highlighting their ties to the University of Central Florida. Mark Schlabach appeared on a Mike Bianchi radio show, which Bianchi followed up with additional press coverage in the form of an article published in the Chicago Tribune. Additional promotion included coverage of the book by Yahoo! and Fox News around the time of the book's release.

Reception
Follow-up coverage of the book after its promotion and release includes being referenced in an article by NBC Sports Northwest that discussed the departure of Shaquem Griffin from the Seattle Seahawks and his accomplishments while he was part of the team, which included writing and publishing this book.

See also
 2019 in literature

References

2019 non-fiction books
Collaborative non-fiction books
Sports biographies
Sports autobiographies
Books about sportspeople
American football books
Thomas Nelson (publisher) books